Remilly-sur-Lozon is a former commune in the Manche department in Normandy in north-western France. On 1 January 2017, it was merged into the new commune Remilly-les-Marais.

Heraldry

See also
Communes of the Manche department

References

External links
Bravery, betrayal and the SAS; Château de Montfort, Remilly-sur-Lozon - a short history of the area with focus on the Resistance and Operation Titanic in WW2

Remillysurlozon